Joaquin Duato (born April 1962) is a Spanish-American business executive. Duato is a dual citizen of Spain and the United States. He is the chief executive officer (CEO) of Johnson & Johnson, an American multinational conglomerate. He is the eighth person to serve as CEO of Johnson & Johnson since it became a publicly-traded company in 1944.

Early life and education 
Duato grew up in Valencia, Spain. His career in healthcare was influenced by his family. His mother was a nurse, his grandfather was a pediatrician, and his grandmother a pharmacist. Duato is trilingual, speaking English, Spanish, and Italian. Duato received a Master of Business Administration from ESADE Business School in Barcelona, Spain, and a Master of International Management from the Thunderbird School of Global Management in Phoenix, Arizona.

Career 
Duato began his career in Johnson & Johnson in 1989 when he joined Janssen Pharmaceutica in Spain. After moving to the USA in 2002, Duato was appointed Executive Vice President, Worldwide Chairman, Pharmaceuticals in 2011. His growth strategy led to the turnaround of Johnson & Johnson’s struggling pharmaceutical business in the early 2000s. In 2018 when he was promoted to Vice-Chairman of Johnson & Johnson’s executive committee, he led the pharmaceuticals and consumer product divisions and oversaw supply-chain and technology operations. He also served as interim Chief Information Officer. Duato was appointed CEO in August 2021 which became effective on January 3, 2022. He was also appointed to the company’s board of directors.

Duato was the executive sponsor of the company's African Ancestry Leadership Council.

Board membership and honors 
Joaquin Duato is a board member of the U.S. Spain Council and previously served on boards with UNICEF USA, Tsinghua University School of Pharmaceutical Sciences, and the Hess Corporation. Duato was past chair of Pharmaceutical Research and Manufacturers of America (PhRMA). Duato was Healthcare Businesswomen’s Association Honorable Mentor honoree and EVP in 2017. In 2021, Duato was ranked #3 on the NJBIZ Manufacturing Power 50 list.

References

External links 
 Joaquin Duato biography

Living people
1962 births
American chief executives